Once Upon a Girl is a 1976 American live-action/adult animated fantasy comedy pornographic film written, produced, and directed by Don Jurwich. It was animated by a group of animators who had worked for Walt Disney Productions and Hanna-Barbera, according to the director in an interview included with the DVD release.

Plot
A lewd old lady claiming to be Mother Goose (Hal Smith) has been put on trial for obscenity due to telling the "true versions" of famous fairy tales.  Her evidence is presented as a collection of pornographic animated shorts, those of Jack and the Beanstalk, Cinderella, and Little Red Riding Hood.

Cast
Hal Smith – Mother Goose (live action segments)/Giant/additionalvoices
Frank Welker – Jack/Fairy Godmother/Prince/additional voices
Richmond Johnson
Carol Piacente
Kelly Gordon

Home video
On November 14, 2006, Severin Films released Once Upon a Girl on DVD.  The DVD features the uncut version, as Severin surrendered the original X rating for an unrated video release.

See also
List of animated feature-length films

References

External links

 
 

1976 films
1976 animated films
1970s American films
1970s English-language films
1970s parody films
1970s pornographic films
American adult animated films
American films with live action and animation
American parody films
Animated anthology films
Censored films
Films based on fairy tales
Pornographic animation